Synadene was a Byzantine Greek woman who briefly acted as queen consort of Hungary, probably in the 1070s. She was most likely married to King Géza I.

Husband's identity 

Synadene's first name is unknown. Her father was the Byzantine commander Theodoulos Synadenos, while her mother was a sister of Nikephoros III Botaneiates, who ruled as Byzantine emperor in 1078–1081. The king's name, much like her own, is not mentioned.

An important clue to the identity of Synadene's husband lies in one of the enamel plaques contained in the Holy Crown of Hungary, which depicts a man identified as "Géza, faithful king of the Hungarians". Géza I's death on 25 April 1077 corresponds to Scylitzes Continuatuss narration, with the queen dowager returning to the Byzantine Empire by late 1079. However, Scylitzes Continuatus mentions no other events from the mid-1090s, which makes it likely that Géza I was the king whom Synadene married.

Marriage date 

The date of Synadene's marriage is even less certain than the identity of her husband. R. Kerbl suggested the period between 1064 and 1067. He referred to the union as a "private arrangement" between Duke Géza and those Byzantine commanders (including Synadene's uncle, who had not yet become emperor) who were in charge of Balkan and Danubian territories. Géza then possibly ruled south-eastern part of Hungary, on the border of the Byzantine Empire, and had a poor relationship with his cousin, King Solomon, making the marriage with Synadene politically advantageous. However, given that Synadene returned to Byzantium upon Géza's death, it is likely that the marriage produced no issue, and that the mother of his children, born in the 1060s, was his first wife, Sophia. It is thus safe to assume that the marriage took place in the mid-1070s.

Sources

11th-century Byzantine women
11th-century Hungarian people
Hungarian queens consort
Byzantine queens consort
Synadenos family